Access Media 3 (“AM3”) is an Internet, television and telephone  provider service company based in Oak Brook, Illinois. The company specializes in providing services to multi-dwelling units such as condominiums, apartments, retirement communities and student housing. At present, AM3 serves clients in Florida, Georgia, Illinois, Minnesota, Tennessee, Texas, North Carolina,  Virginia, and Washington, DC.  Currently, AM3 serves approximately 50,000 revenue generating units (RGUs) in over 450 properties. AM3 also conducts business as Upstream Network, in an effort to distance itself from the tarnished Access Media 3 branding.

History
Access Media 3 was founded by CEO Scott Rediger in January 2007 in a merger with MDI Access.  Rediger's previous experience in the telecom industry included his role as a co-founder of Ovation Communications, a competitive local exchange carrier business offering facility-based local, long distance, and data services to medium and large sized businesses in the metropolitan areas of Chicago, Minneapolis, St. Paul, Milwaukee and Detroit. After two years, Ovation Communications was sold to McLeod USA in 1999 for $402 million. After the sale, Rediger served as a Senior Vice President of Products and Development for McLeod USA.

AM3's business model specifically targeted multi-unit residential buildings as a market for customized bundled media services. The company works directly with property owners, associations and managers to design individualized packages of high-speed internet, voice and television from DIRECTV™.

AM3 expanded rapidly through both organic sales growth and strategic acquisitions. Following its initial merger with MDI Access, AM3 acquired:

 Satellite television assets of Tunnel Vision Technology, Inc. in Chicago in September 2007
 inVision Networks in Burr Ridge, Illinois in May 2008
 SkyPix LLC of Bloomington, Minnesota in June 2008
 Avvid Technologies in Minneapolis/St. Paul in April 2010
 Cipher Ltd.|Cipher Ltd.’s MDU division in Chicago in April 2010
 onShore Networks LLC's|onShore Networks LLC's MDU division in Chicago in April 2010
 People's Choice Cable in Boca Raton, Florida in June 2011
 Limited assets of Shentel MTC in Georgia, Tennessee, Virginia and Washington D.C. in January 2012.

Financial backing for acquisitions came in part from investment support by private equity concerns Meritage Funds and WP Global Partners, as well as a credit facility relationship with JP Morgan Chase and financing support from Hinsdale Bank and Trust, a Wintrust Community Bank Charter. AM3 also expanded its sales staff to promote organic sales among property managers and owners.  As a result, AM3s RGU base rose from approximately 3000 in 2007 to over 50,000 in 2011. In early 2012, AM3 secured $30 Million in funding from ORIX Venture Finance and Petra Capital Partners to fuel continued growth.

Awards
AM3 and its leadership have received recognition for the company's swift growth, including:

 Inclusion in the 2011 Inc. 500 list of the fastest growing companies nationally
 Recognition of Scott Rediger in the Growth category of the 2011 Entrepreneurial Excellence Awards sponsored by the Daily Herald Business Ledger
 Receipt of the DIRECTV Highest Year-to-Year Growth Award in 2010
 Appointment of Scott Rediger to DIRECTV's MDU Board of Advisers in 2010
 Repeated inclusion in the DIRECTV Excel Club Award

Criticism

Tracking users by injecting javascript in HTML contents 

On January 5, 2014, it was published and documented by a customer, that Access Media 3 is injecting tracking javascript into all HTTP request bodies. The purpose of the tracking is yet unknown, but the front page of RG Nets states:

In a brochure, RG Nets state about the  box:

the rXg is the perfect platform for clear communication, authoritative control and complete cognizance over your RGN end-user population.:

Contemporary profitable IP RGNs extract revenue from the end-user community through a combination of direct and indirect mechanisms. The classic IP RGN business model that focuses on direct billing of end-users is giving way to hybrid models that employ advertising, user profiling and premium services with automated up-sell.:

Inspecting, recording, analyzing and understanding how end-users consume the available resources as well as how they interact with the offered service levels is a critically important aspect of operating an RGN.:

Around October 2014, Access Media 3 responded to the original author that broke the story admitting to using a Man-in-the-middle attack to insert HTML code into unsecured, non-SSL websites as an "advertising tool".Many of you have approached me about the pop up residents see when online. I do want to let you know this is an advertising tool. Access Media 3 does not track users’ web activity, collect personally identifiable information, nor sell users’ personal information. Aggregate browsing information may be used to deliver an advertisement that is more tailored to our users’ perceived interests. The application should have no impact on the user experience. Upon further investigation we found that the system was slightly impacting browsing by creating a very small ribbon at the top of the browser. We are working with our developers to identify and correct the case.

If you need to share this with your residents please feel free but just wanted you to have the information incase you are asked! Thank you and have a great week!

References

External links
 Official Website
 Upstream Network Official Website

Mass media companies of the United States